New York City's 41st City Council district is one of 51 districts in the New York City Council. It has been represented by Democrat Darlene Mealy since 2022, succeeding fellow Democrat Alicka Ampry-Samuel; Mealy defeated Ampry-Samuel in the 2021 Democratic primary.

Geography 
District 41 covers a series of predominantly Black neighborhoods in central and eastern Brooklyn, including parts of Bedford–Stuyvesant, Brownsville, East Flatbush, Crown Heights, and Ocean Hill.

The district overlaps with Brooklyn Community Boards 3, 8, 9, 16, and 17, and with New York's 8th and 9th congressional districts. It also overlaps with the 18th, 19th, 20th, 21st, and 25th districts of the New York State Senate, and with the 43rd, 54th, 55th, 56th, and 58th districts of the New York State Assembly.

As of the 2010 Census, the district was over 80 percent Black, making it the district with the largest Black population in the city. Correspondingly, every councilmember to represent the district since its creation has been Black.

Recent election results

2021 
In 2019, voters in New York City approved Ballot Question 1, which implemented ranked-choice voting in all local elections. Under the new system, voters have the option to rank up to five candidates for every local office. Voters whose first-choice candidates fare poorly will have their votes redistributed to other candidates in their ranking until one candidate surpasses the 50 percent threshold. If one candidate surpasses 50 percent in first-choice votes, then ranked-choice tabulations will not occur.

2017

2013

References 

New York City Council districts